Turcinoemacheilus is a genus of stone loaches native to Asia.

Species
There are currently 6 recognized species in this genus:
 Turcinoemacheilus bahaii Esmaeili, Sayyadzadeh, Özuluğ, Geiger & Freyhof, 2014
 Turcinoemacheilus hafezi Golzarianpour, Abdoli, Patimar & Freyhof, 2013
 Turcinoemacheilus himalaya Conway, Edds, Shrestha & Mayden, 2011
 Turcinoemacheilus kosswigi Bănărescu & Nalbant, 1964
 Turcinoemacheilus minimus Esmaeili, Sayyadzadeh, Özuluğ, Geiger & Freyhof, 2014
 Turcinoemacheilus saadii Esmaeili, Sayyadzadeh, Özuluğ, Geiger & Freyhof, 2014

References

Nemacheilidae
Fish of Asia
Taxa named by Petre Mihai Bănărescu
Taxa named by Teodor T. Nalbant